Muslims constitute 5.6 percent of the population of Trinidad and Tobago. The majority live in Trinidad but there are a handful in Tobago as well.

History
The first Muslims to arrive in the country arrived from Africa brought as slaves by the colonists. The second group arrived in 1816 as a small proportion of those of the Corps of Colonial Marines who were African-born and had been recruited in 1815 in Georgia during the War of 1812, mostly settled in Fifth and Sixth Companies within the Company Villages near Princes Town. They were followed by African Muslims among disbanded members of the West India Regiments settled between 1817 and 1825 in Manzanilla on the East Coast and in a group of villages south-east of Valencia, and further African Muslims were brought to Trinidad as a result of the Royal Navy's interception of slaving ships following the Slave Trade Acts. From the 1840s, Muslims came from South Asia as part of the Indian indenture system to work on sugar cane and cacao plantations. Muslims today are mostly of South Asian descent but there are converts from all races. In Trinidad there are Islamic primary and secondary schools. The first Muslim secondary school in the country, ASJA Boys' College, San Fernando, was established in 1960.  There are many mosques and Eid ul Fitr is a public holiday. There are several mosques belonging to the Ahmadiyya Muslim Community  and 5 mosques belonging to the Ahmadiyya Anjuman Isha'at Islam Lahore. 
 
In 2005, an Islamic television channel IBN Channel 8 was born.  In 2006 Darut Tarbiyah - The Islamic Network (T.I.N.) was established.

Notable Muslims
 Inshan Ali
 Mahaboob Ben Ali
 Radanfah Abu Bakr
Yasin Abu Bakr, leader of the attempted coup d’état of 1990.
Khalid Hassanali
 Noor Hassanali, former President
 Imran N. Hosein
 Haji Gokool Meah
 Jamaal Shabazz
 Inshan Ishmael, the owner of IBN
Yacoob Ali

See also
Hosay
Hosay massacre
Jonas Mohammed Bath
Organisation of Islamic Cooperation
Jamaat al Muslimeen

References

External links
 Muslims in T&T - Trinidad Guardian, Indian Diaspora Supplement May 30, 2000. National Library Archive
 The Trinidad & Tobago Masjid Project (at TriniMuslims.com) - comprehensive list of masaajid in T&T.
 Pictures of Masjids in Trinidad and Tobago
  Saudi Aramco World - Muslims in the Caribbean - Trinidad, Guyana etc.
 How a Minister in Trinidad and Tobago entered Islam

 
Trinidad
Religion in Trinidad and Tobago